The 28th AVN Awards ceremony in Las Vegas, presented by Adult Video News (AVN), honored the best pornographic movies and adult entertainment products of 2010. The ceremony was held on January 8, 2011 in the Pearl Concert Theater inside the Palms Casino Resort in Paradise, Nevada. During the ceremony, AVN Media Network presented awards in 155 categories of movies or products released between October 1, 2009, and September 30, 2010. The ceremony was televised in the United States by Showtime. Comedian Lisa Lampanelli hosted the show with co-hosts Tori Black and Riley Steele.

AVN increased the number of people who voted on the awards to more than forty, "roughly divided evenly between in-house AVN editors, freelancers and outside critics" by adding "Xcitement Magazine’s Cindi Loftus, Genesis Magazine’s Dan Davis, RogReviews.com’s Roger Pipe, DrunkenStepfather.com’s Drunken Stepfather, Theresa “Darklady” Reed, former AVN editors Tod Hunter and Jared Rutter, XCritic.com’s Christopher Thorne, Dr. Jay and Don Houston, members of AdultDVDTalk.com and others."

Fan awards were also introduced in 2011. Winners were selected by voting two weeks before the show. Fans were able to vote in four categories: Favorite Performer, Favorite Body, Favorite Movie, and Wildest Sex Scene.

Speed earned Best Feature honors for Brad Armstrong who also took home the Best Director—Feature award. Tori Black won her second Female Performer of the Year award, the first actress to do so in the event's 28-year history, while Gracie Glam won the Best New Starlet Award. Evan Stone became a three-time Male Performer of the Year, joining Manuel Ferrara and Lexington Steele as the two others with three wins in the category.

Winners and nominees 

The nominees for the 28th AVN Awards were announced on Nov. 29, 2010 in a press release. The film receiving the most nominations was Malice in Lalaland with 19, while performer Tori Black had the most individual nominations with 22, an AVN Awards record. The winners were announced during the awards ceremony on January 8, 2011, which were taped for broadcast April 7 on Showtime.

Major Awards 
Award winners are listed first and highlighted in boldface.

Additional Award Winners 
These awards were announced in a winners-only segment but were not presented their awards on stage during the event and were not part of the televised awards show:

DVD Categories
 Best All-Girl Release: Meow!
 Best All-Girl Series: Women Seeking Women
 Best All-Sex Release: Just Jenna
 Best All-Sex Series: Don’t Make Me Beg
 Best Alternative Release: Extreme Public Adventures
 Best Amateur Release: Absolute Amateurs 3
 Best Amateur Series: ATK Galleria
 Best Anal-Themed Release: Big Wet Asses! 16
 Best Anal-Themed Series: Evil Anal
 Best Animated Release: Bound to Please
 Best BDSM Release: Bondage Wonderland
 Best Big Bust Release: Bra Busters
 Best Big Bust Series: Big Tits at School
 Best Big Butt Release: Asslicious 2
 Best Big Butt Series: Big Ass Fixation
 Best Classic Release: Aunt Peg's Fulfillment
 Best Comedy: Couples Camp
 Best DVD Extras: Speed, Wicked Pictures
 Best DVD Menus: Batman XXX: A Porn Parody - Axel Braun/Vivid Entertainment
 Best Educational Release: Tristan Taormino’s Expert Guide to Advanced Fellatio
 Best Ethnic-Themed Release – Asian: Asian Fucking Nation 4
 Best Ethnic-Themed Release – Black: Black Ass Addiction 6
 Best Ethnic-Themed Release – Latin: Buttman’s Rio Extreme Girls
 Best Ethnic-Themed Series – Asian: Naughty Little Asians
 Best Ethnic-Themed Series – Black: Black Ass Addiction
 Best Ethnic-Themed Series – Latin: Latin Adultery
 Best Fem-Dom Strap-On Release: Strap Attack 12
 Best Foot/Leg Fetish Release: Party of Feet 2
 Best Foreign All-Sex Release: Tori Black: Nymphomaniac
 Best Foreign All-Sex Series: Rocco: Puppet Master
 Best Foreign Feature: Alice: A Fairy Love Tale
 Best Gonzo Series: Slutty and Sluttier
 Best Interactive DVD: Interactive Sex with Alexis Texas
 Best Internal Release: Unplanned Parenthood
 Best Internal Series: All Internal
 Best Interracial Series: It’s Big, It’s Black, It’s Jack
 Best MILF Release: Dirty Rotten Mother Fuckers 4
 Best MILF Series: Seasoned Players
 Best New Line: The Ass Factory
 Best New Video Production Company: Axel Braun Productions
 Best Older Woman/Younger Girl Release: Mother-Daughter Exchange Club 12
 Best Online Marketing Campaign – Company Image: Adam & Eve Pictures, AdamEvePictures.com
 Best Online Marketing Campaign – Individual Project: BatfXXX: Dark Night Parody, Bluebird Films (BatFXXX.com)
 Best Oral Release: Fuck Face
 Best Oral Series: Suck It Dry
 Best Orgy/Gangbang Release: Out Numbered 5
 Best Orgy/Gangbang Series: Fuck Team Five
 Best Overall Marketing Campaign – Company Image: Vivid Entertainment
 Best Overall Marketing Campaign – Individual Project: Batman XXX: A Porn Parody, Axel Braun/Vivid Entertainment
 Best Packaging: Body Heat,  Digital Playground
 Best Packaging Innovation: Malice in Lalaland - Miss Lucifer/Vivid Entertainment
 Best POV Release: Jack’s POV 15
 Best POV Series: Jack’s POV
 Best Pro-Am Release: Brand New Faces 26
 Best Pro-Am Series: Can He Score?
 Best Solo Release: All by Myself 4
 Best Special Effects: BatfXXX: Dark Night Parody
 Best Specialty Release – Other Genre: Asses of Face Destruction 9
 Best Specialty Series: Barefoot Confidential
 Best Squirting Release: Big League Squirters
 Best Squirting Series: Squirtamania
 Best Transsexual Release: America’s Next Top Tranny: Season 6
 Best Transsexual Series: She-Male XTC
 Best Vignette Release: Pornstars Punishment
 Best Vignette Series: Bad Girls
 Best Young Girl Release: Cum Spoiled Brats
 Best Young Girl Series: Barely Legal
 Clever Title of the Year: The Devil Wears Nada

Performer/Creator Categories
 Best All-Girl Group Sex Scene: Kayden Kross, Jesse Jane, Riley Steele, Katsuni, Raven Alexis - Body Heat
 Best All-Girl Three-Way Sex Scene: Alexis Texas, Kristina Rose, Asa Akira - Buttwoman vs. Slutwoman
 Best Anal Sex Scene: Asa Akira, Manuel Ferrara - Asa Akira Is Insatiable
 Best Art Direction: BatfXXX: Dark Night Parody
 Best Cinematography/Videography: Fliktor, Butch, BatfXXX: Dark Night Parody
 Best Director – Ethnic Video: Jules Jordan - Lex the Impaler 5
 Best Director – Foreign Feature: Paul Chaplin - Department S, Mission One: City of Broken Angels
 Best Director – Foreign Non-Feature: Gazzman - Tori Black: Nymphomaniac
 Best Director – Non Feature: William H., Performers of the Year 2010
 Best Editing: Lew Xypher - Malice in Lalaland
 Best Group Sex Scene: Alexis Texas, Kristina Rose, Gracie Glam, Michael Stefano, Buttwoman vs. Slutwoman
 Best Makeup: Red Velvet, Rosa, Lisa Sloane, Melissa Makeup - BatfXXX: Dark Night Parody
 Best Male Newcomer: Seth Gamble
 Best Music Soundtrack: This Ain't Glee XXX
 Best Non-Sex Performance: James Bartholet, Not Charlie’s Angels XXX
 Best Original Song: “Big Tushy Hos” by Drew Rose - This Ain't Glee XXX
 Best POV Sex Scene: Tori Black, Jack’s POV 15
 Best Screenplay – Adapted: Axel Braun, Batman XXX: A Porn Parody
 Best Screenplay – Original: David Stanley, The Condemned
 Best Sex Scene in a Foreign-Shot Production: Tori Black, Steve Holmes, Jazz Duro - Tori Black: Nymphomaniac
 Best Solo Sex Scene: Joanna Angel, Rebel Girl
 Best Supporting Actor: Evan Stone - Batman XXX: A Porn Parody
 Best Supporting Actress: Lexi Belle - Batman XXX: A Porn Parody
 Best Tease Performance: Eva Angelina, Alexis Texas - Car Wash Girls
 Best Three-Way Sex Scene, Girl /Boy/Boy: Asa Akira, Prince Yahshua, Jon Jon - Asa Akira Is Insatiable
 Director of the Year (Body of Work): Axel Braun
 Female Foreign Performer of the Year: Angel Dark
 Male Foreign Performer of the Year: Rocco Siffredi
 MILF/Cougar Performer of the Year: Julia Ann
 Most Outrageous Sex Scene: Adrianna Nicole, Amy Brooke, Allie Haze in “Enema Boot Camp,” Belladonna: Fetish Fanatic 8
 Transsexual Performer of the Year: Bailey Jay
 Unsung Male Performer of the Year: Mark Ashley
 Unsung Starlet of the Year: Charley Chase

Retail and Distribution Categories
 Best Adult Distributor: IVD/East Coast News
 Best Boutique (East): Eve’s Garden, New York, NY
 Best Boutique (West): Babeland, Seattle, WA
 Best Retail Chain: Good Vibrations
 Best Retail Store (East): Fairvilla Megastore, Orlando, FL
 Best Retail Store (West): Castle Megastore, Tempe, AZ

Sex Toys and Pleasure Products
 Best Fetish Product: Ballz Gag, Stockroom
 Best Lingerie or Apparel Company: Baci Lingerie
 Best Overall Sex Toy Line: Fleshlight Girls, Fleshlight
 Best Packaging Doc Johnson, Platinum Pure Silicon
 Best Party, Game or Gag Product: Love Poker, California Exotic Novelties
 Best Sex Accessory: Afterglow Natural Massage Oil Candle, Jimmyjane
 Best Sex Toy Company (Large): LELO
 Best Sex Toy Company (Small): Je Joue
 Best Sex Toy for Couples: Couples Remote Control Vibrating Egg, Penthouse/Topco
 Best Sex Toy for Men: Sex in A Can, Fleshlight
 Best Sex Toy for Women: G-Ki, Je Joue

Web and Technology Categories
 Best Alternative Website: Kink.com
 Best Dating Website: AshleyMadison.com
 Best Live Chat Website: IMLive.com
 Best Membership Site: AbbyWinters.com
 Best Membership Site Network: Brazzers.com
 Best Photography Website: AndrewBlake.com
 Best Retail Website: AdultDVDEmpire.com
 Best Web Premiere: Dong of the Dead, BurningAngel.com
 Best Web Star: Kelly Madison, KellyMadison.com

Honorary AVN Awards

Reuben Sturman Award
John Stagliano was awarded the Reuben Sturman Award "for his successful defense of obscenity charges" in 2010.

Hall of Fame
AVN Hall of Fame inductees for 2011 were: Belladonna, Axel Braun, Gia Darling, Ben Dover, Jada Fire, Jules Jordan, Bridgette Kerkove, Miles Long, Sinnamon Love, Sonny Malone, Pat Myne, Savanna Samson, Jasmin St. Claire, Scott St. James and Evan Stone.
 Founders Branch: Russell Hampshire, VCA Pictures; Mike Moran, Lion's Den; Steven Orenstein, Wicked Pictures
 Pleasure Product Branch: Joani Blank, Good Vibrations; Ron Braverman, Doc Johnson; Susan Colvin, California Exotic Novelties; Marty Tucker, Topco.
 Internet Founders Branch: Mitch Farber, Netbilling; Colin Rowntree, Wasteland.com; Tim Valenti, NakedSword.com.

Multiple nominations and awards 

The following releases received multiple awards:
 7 awards: Batman XXX: A Porn Parody
 6 awards: BatfXXX: Dark Night Parody
 4 awards: Asa Akira Is Insatiable, Speed
 3 awards: Body Heat, Buttwoman vs. Slutwoman, This Ain't Glee XXX and Tori Black: Nymphomaniac
 2 awards: The Condemned, Jack’s POV 15, Lex the Impaler 5, Malice in Lalaland, Meow! and Performers of the Year 2010

The following releases received the most nominations
 19 nominations: Malice in Lalaland
 16 nominations: BatfXXX: Dark Night Parody, Batman XXX: A Porn Parody
 15 nominations: Speed, The Big Lebowski: A XXX Parody
 14 nominations: The Sex Files 2: A Dark XXX Parody, Bonny & Clide
 11 nominations: Body Heat, The Condemned, An Open Invitation: A Real Swinger's Party in San Francisco

The following individuals received multiple awards:
 4 awards: Asa Akira, Tori Black
 3 awards: Axel Braun, Kristina Rose, Riley Steele, Evan Stone, Alexis Texas
 2 awards: Raven Alexis, Joanna Angel, Manuel Ferrara, Gracie Glam, Jesse Jane, Jules Jordan, Katsuni, Kayden Kross

The following individuals received the most nominations:
 22 nominations (an AVN Awards record): Tori Black
 17 nominations: Bobbi Starr
 14 nominations: Kristina Rose
 13 nominations: Andy San Dimas
 12 nominations (excluding nominations as producer): Manuel Ferrara
 10 nominations: Asa Akira

Presenters and performers
The following individuals were presenters or performers during the awards ceremony:

Presenters

Trophy girls 

 Madelyn Marie
 Chanel Preston

Performers

Changes to awards categories 
Beginning with the 28th AVN Awards, AVN Media Network added a category to the awards show, entitled Best Web Premiere, "to recognize original and outstanding content production exclusively for the web."

Five new categories were also introduced to recognize the retail and distribution sector of the adult industry:
 Best Adult Distributor (East region)
 Best Adult Distributor (West region)
 Best Retail Boutique (East region)
 Best Retail Boutique (West region)
 Best Retail Chain

Controversies 
Comedian Andy Dick was ejected from the awards ceremony before the show had even started for allegedly pestering adult star Tera Patrick and drag queen Chi Chi LaRue backstage.

See also

 AVN Award for Male Performer of the Year
 AVN Female Performer of the Year Award
 AVN Award for Male Foreign Performer of the Year
 List of members of the AVN Hall of Fame

References

Other sources

External links

 
 Adult Video News Awards  at the IMDb
 

AVN Awards
AVN Awards 28